Maritza Meléndez Nazario (born February 6, 1959) is a Puerto Rican politician and former mayor of Naguabo. Meléndez is affiliated with the New Progressive Party (PNP) and served as mayor from 2009 to 2013. Has a Bachelor in commercial secretarial education from the University of Puerto Rico and a Masters in administration and supervision from the University of Turabo. He was the first lady of Naguabo when her husband José A. Meléndez was the mayor from 1988 to 2000. Maritza Meléndez Nazario ran for mayor at the 2008 election where she was elected the first woman mayor of Naguabo.

References

External links

Living people
Mayors of places in Puerto Rico
New Progressive Party (Puerto Rico) politicians
People from Naguabo, Puerto Rico
University of Puerto Rico alumni
Puerto Rican women in politics
Women mayors of places in Puerto Rico
1959 births